The 2011–12 Vanderbilt Commodores men's basketball team represented Vanderbilt University during the 2011–12 NCAA Division I men's basketball season. The Commodores, members of the Southeastern Conference, were coached by Kevin Stallings, and celebrated their 60th season in their current home arena, Memorial Gymnasium. After a 21–10 regular season that fell short of lofty preseason expectations, the Commodores captured their first SEC Tournament Championship in 61 seasons on March 11, 2012, by defeating Georgia, Ole Miss, and top-ranked Kentucky in consecutive days. In the 2012 NCAA tournament they defeated Harvard in the second round before falling in the third round to Wisconsin to finish the season 25–11.

Before the season
The Commodores came off a 2010–11 season that ended with a second-round (first game) upset by Richmond in the NCAA tournament. This continued a recent history of tournament disappointments for Vanderbilt, whose last three NCAA appearances had all ended with a first-game loss to a double-digit seed.

During the offseason, the coaching staff saw one change when assistant King Rice was hired as head coach at Monmouth. Rice was replaced by David Cason, a former player under Stallings at Illinois State who had spent the previous six seasons as an assistant with Tulsa.

Class of 2011 signees

2011–12 outlook
In a major offseason development, three of the Commodores' most important players—Festus Ezeli, John Jenkins, and Jeffery Taylor—all spurned the NBA draft and announced they would return for the 2011–12 season. Jenkins, the SEC's leading scorer in 2010–11 at 19.5 points per game, was chosen for the All-SEC first team. Ezeli, who averaged 13 points, 6.3 rebounds, and 2.6 blocks in a breakout season, was named to the All-SEC second team, and was also named by multiple sources as one of the most improved players in the country. Taylor averaged 14.7 points while being named to the All-SEC second team, as well as the SEC All-Defensive Team. Ezeli, Jenkins, and Taylor were all named by Basketball Prospectus in its 2011–12 preseason outlook as among the top 20 players in college basketball, making Vanderbilt the only Division I men's team with three top-20 performers.

These decisions meant that Vanderbilt would return all five of its starters from last season, all of them seniors except for Jenkins, a junior. Another returning starter, point guard Brad Tinsley, led the SEC in assists in 2010–11 with 4.6 per game.

The Commodores thus were widely projected as a preseason top-10 team, with ESPN's Hall of Fame commentator Dick Vitale going so far as to rank them #5 in his preseason top 40.

Less than a month before the start of the season, the NCAA suspended Ezeli 6 games after accepting a meal and hotel room from a Vanderbilt alumnus during a summer trip. He was able to practice with the team during the suspension, and was also eligible to play in the team's preseason exhibition game (but was unable to play in that game). Ezeli came off his suspension for the Xavier game on November 28; however, he suffered a sprained knee during a late-October practice, and did not return until the Davidson game on December 7.

Roster

Schedule

|-
!colspan=12| Exhibition

|-
!colspan=12| Regular season

|-
!colspan=12| 2012 SEC tournament

|-

|-

|-
!colspan=12|2012 NCAA tournament

|-

|-

Notes and references

Vanderbilt
Vanderbilt Commodores men's basketball seasons
Vanderbilt
Vanderbilt Commodores men's basketball
Vanderbilt Commodores men's basketball